The Department of Children, Equality, Disability, Integration and Youth is a department of the Government of Ireland. It is led by the Minister for Children, Equality, Disability, Integration and Youth.

Departmental team
The official headquarters and ministerial offices of the department are on Baggot Street, Dublin. The departmental team consists of the following:
Minister for Children, Equality, Disability, Integration and Youth: Roderic O'Gorman, TD
Minister of State at the Department of Children, Equality, Disability, Integration and Youth, with responsibility for Disability: Anne Rabbitte, TD
Minister of State at the Department of Children, Equality, Disability, Integration and Youth, with responsibility for Integration: Joe O'Brien, TD
Secretary General of the Department: Kevin McCarthy

Divisions
Early Learning and Care and School-Age Childcare Division
Justice, International Protection and Equality
Child Policy and Tusla Governance Division
Corporate and Business Support Division
Youth Justice, Adoption, Youth and Participation Division

The Child and Family Agency, known as Tusla, is an independent agency established on 1 January 2014 and answerable to the department.

History
The department was created by the Ministers and Secretaries (Amendment) Act 1956 as the Department of the Gaeltacht, an act of the 7th Government of Ireland led by John A. Costello. This act provided its function as:

Over the years the name and functions of the department have changed several times by means of statutory instruments. The department currently responsible for the Gaeltacht is the Department of Tourism, Culture, Arts, Gaeltacht, Sport and Media. The Department of Children, Equality, Disability, Integration and Youth has had its current title and functions since 2020.

Alteration of name and transfer of functions

References

External links
Department of Children, Equality, Disability, Integration and Youth
Structure of the Department
Spending by the Department

 
Ministries established in 1956
Children
Ireland
1956 establishments in Ireland
Youth in the Republic of Ireland
Children's rights in Ireland
Ireland
Ireland